Arabian Knight is a title used by multiple  fictional characters appearing in American comic books published by Marvel Comics.

Publication history

Abdul Qamar first appeared in Incredible Hulk vol. 2 #257 (March 1981), and was created by Bill Mantlo (writer) and Al Milgrom (artist).

“The Arabian Knight is a new character,” said Schmidt namesake heir. “We’ve had the Arabian Knight before, but the last version of the Arabian Knight, I believe, was killed twice without explanation of how he came back between them. He was sort of an insulting stereotype.”
 
The successor (Navid Hashim) was created by Christos Gage and Mike Perkins. According to editor Andy Schmidt, "The old one had all the stereotypical trappings—the flying carpet and whatnot. And some of that stuff is incorporated into this new one, but hopefully in a less stereotypical way and not insulting. He’s a fully fleshed out character. The other guy was just a visual stereotype with no real character behind him."

Fictional character biography

Abdul Qamar

Abdul Qamar, the first Arabian Knight, was a descendant of a legendary Muslim hero who had perished forcing the demons Gog and Magog back into their tomb. When the demons were later freed by an archeologist, Abdul found his ancestor's magical equipment inside the tomb, and became the Arabian Knight, once again sealing away the demons with help from the Hulk. He met Ghost Rider, and allied with him against the Water Wizard.

He was also one of the heroes chosen by Death to represent her in the Contest of Champions against the Grandmaster, his teammates being Iron Man and Sabra. He overcame his dislike of the Israeli heroine to win their battle against She-Hulk, Captain Britain and Defensor.

Abdul later battled the Demon of the Dunes for the life of his son.

The Arabian Knight was later revealed to be an agent of the clandestine international group The Pantheon. Posing as a member of the organization Desert Sword, he fought against Freedom Force. (it was originally stated that his children had been kidnapped by Desert Sword, who forced Abdul to work in their service). The Knight left the Pantheon following a disagreement with Achilles.

Abdul died when Humus Sapien, a powerful mutant whose abilities are powered by the random draining of life from a large number of people, drained him of his life force.

Navid Hashim

Navid Hashim - the next Arabian Knight - debuted in 2006's Union Jack (3rd series) #1. Unlike the first two Arabian Knights, the third dresses in contemporary military clothing and appears to have extensive combat experience.

When Red Hulk and Machine Man arrived in Sharzhad, they encounter Arabian Knight who leads them into Sharzhad and to Dagan Shah's palace. Once inside the palace, Dagan Shah sheds his disguise, reveals his true identity as the Sultan Magus, and imprisons Red Hulk and Machine Man as it is shown that the real Arabian Knight is imprisoned in a crystal. During Red Hulk and Machine Man's fight with Sultan Magus, Arabian Knight gets free and helps in the fight against Sultan Magus, when he manages to cut off Sultan Magus' arms (yet Sultan Magus managed to reattach his arms before resuming the fight).

Arabian Knight later represented the Arabian government when he attended Black Panther's meeting in the Eden Room of Avengers Mountain.

Powers and abilities
The first Arabian Knight had the normal abilities of a healthy, athletic human. He was a good hand-to-hand combatant and was an exceptional swordsman, particularly in the use of the scimitar. He possesses three magical weapons: a magic carpet, a golden scimitar emitting beams of magical force, and a mind-controlled belt/sash. Indeed, all three items respond, exclusively, to his mental commands. He discovered his weapons, which had belonged to a 13th-century ancestor, in an underground tomb in the Egyptian desert. The magic carpet and sash are formed from a material that is virtually indestructible, resisting fire, and even bullets. The golden scimitar, in addition to firing destructive blasts, will "backfire" against any other person who may attempt to wield it.

The next Arabian Knight revealed that the magic carpet used by the first Arabian Knight was unraveled and made into an indestructible uniform that responds to his thoughts. He still uses the magic scimitar and wears the red magic sash around his waist. The uniform serves as body armor that protects him from harm and allows him to fly.

Reception

Comic Book Resources placed the original Arabian Knight as one of the superheroes Marvel wants you to forget.

Other characters named Arabian Knight
An unrelated character named Arabian Knight appeared in Black Panther vol. 4 #15 (June 2006). He was depicted as a Muslim warrior who won the right to use the magical scimitar, carpet, and armor due to trial by combat. This Arabian Knight showed up as a part of an international attempt to invade Wakanda, and was defeated by the Black Panther and Storm.

References

External links
 
 
 
 Marvel Directory: Arabian Knight I

Characters created by Al Milgrom
Characters created by Bill Mantlo
Comics characters introduced in 1981
Comics characters introduced in 2006
Fictional Arabs
Fictional swordfighters in comics
Marvel Comics characters who use magic
Marvel Comics martial artists
Marvel Comics superheroes